Gulabi Talkies is a 2008 Indian Kannada language film by acclaimed Indian director Girish Kasaravalli. It is based on a short story by the same name by Kannada writer Vaidehi.

The film premiered at the Osian's Cinefan Festival of Asian and Arab Cinema in New Delhi on 14 July 2008, where it won the Best Film and Best Actress awards in the Indian Competition section. Umashree won the National Award for Best Actress for her performance in the film.

Plot
The film is set in the late 1990s among the fishing communities around Kundapura, in the southwestern Indian state of Karnataka. The impulsive midwife Gulabi (Umashree) is the protagonist, whose one passion is the cinema. She leads a lonely life in an island inhabited by fisher folk. Her husband Musa (K.G. Krishna Murthy), a small-time fish-selling agent, has deserted her and is living happily with his second wife Kunjipathu and their child Adda.

A family gifts her a television with a satellite dish antenna in gratitude after she attends to a difficult delivery (for which they even had to bodily remove her from a movie theatre). The arrival of the first color TV in her small island village heralds great changes in the sleepy hamlet. The women in the village begin gathering at her house once the men leave for fishing. However, a few of them stay away, since Gulabi is one of the few Muslims in the village. Yet others prefer to watch from outside her shack, without entering it.

Among the regulars at her home is Netru (singer-actress M.D. Pallavi), a girl with an absentee husband and a domineering mother-in-law, whom Gulabi befriends and becomes a confidante to. But Netru disappears and Gulabi is blamed, leaving her all alone in the village.

The Kargil War of 1999 and the rise of communalism in Karnataka provide the backdrop to the film. The communal stereotyping of Muslims following the Kargil War finds an echo in the village. The tension between the small fishermen of the village and a Muslim businessman (who is actually never shown throughout the film) with a growing fleet of commercial trawlers acquires a communal color.

The disappearance of Netru adds to the mounting tensions. The Muslims in the village flee and urge Gulabi to leave too, but she refuses and stays put in the village. Her house is vandalized and she is forcibly taken to a boat to leave the island. The young men from outside who spearhead the attack assure the villagers that Gulabi's television would remain in her house.

The film ends with a scene in which two illiterate elderly women, who had hitherto refused to enter Gulabi's house, going in there to watch TV (which they do not know how to switch on - they are probably unaware even that it has to be switched on).

Reception

Critical response 

R G Vijayasarathy of Rediff.com scored the film at 5 out of 5 stars and wrote "The director has used many local artists in the film who have also delivered very good performances. Camera work by Ramachandra and background score by Issac Thomas Kottukapalli are top class. By all yardsticks, Gulab Talkies is an outstanding film that cannot be missed". A critic from The Hollywood Reporter wrote "Natural and authentic, the movie also scores with its top-rate performances. Umashree is excellent as a barren woman, shunned by her husband, but sought after by the people for her warmth and geniality. She conveys the pain and pathos of her paradoxical life with a subtlety rarely seen on the Indian screen. Krishnamurthy and Sandip are engaging as the two fishermen troubled and tormented by dwindling supplies, rising tempers and a widening chasm between religions". Jay Weissberg of Variety (magazine) wrote "Vet d.p. Ramachandra Aithal lenses the watery domains with the eye of a sympathetic observer, making the most of the evocative production design. Color processing, at least on the DVD viewed, is on the cheaper side".

Awards and recognition
 Osian's Cinefan Festival of Asian and Arab Cinema, 2008
 Best Film in Indian Competition
 Best Actress in Indian Competition - Umashree
 Karnataka State Film Awards 2007-08
 Best Film
 Best Screenplay - Girish Kasaravalli
 Best Actress - Umashree
 57th National Film Awards
 Best Actress - Umashree
 Best Feature Film in Kannada

References

External links
 
Girish Kasaravalli talks about Gulabi Talkies

Reviews
 "A village on the screen", IndiaTogether.org
 "A masterpiece from Girish Kasaravalli", Rediff.com
 Review on Indian Auteur
 Review on VarietyAsiaOnline.com

2008 films
2000s Kannada-language films
Films featuring a Best Actress National Award-winning performance
Films directed by Girish Kasaravalli
Best Kannada Feature Film National Film Award winners